Röa may refer to several places in Estonia:

Röa, Järva County, a village in Väätsa Parish, Järva County
Röa, Rapla County, a village in Rapla Parish, Rapla County